Lakeland is a rural town and locality in the Shire of Cook, Queensland, Australia.

Geography 
Lakeland is a small farming centre on the Cape York Peninsula.  It is at the junction of the main Peninsula Developmental Road (which is paved all the way from Cairns to Lakeland), and the Mulligan Highway (formerly the Cooktown Developmental Road).

An area of basalt in the Lakeland region contains locally significant groundwater supplies which feed numerous springs, and also provides irrigation water and fertile soils for farming.

Lakeland has the following mountains:

 Belle View Peak
 Hamilton Peak 
 Macdonalds Hill 
 Mount Amy 
 Mount Byerley 
 Mount Earl 
 Mount Emily 
 Mount Eykin 
 Mount Fahey 
 Mount Gibson 
 Mount Herman 
 Mount Janet 
 Mount Lukin 
 Mount Macdonald 
 Mount Mccormack 
 Mount Mclean 
 Mount Murray 
 Mount Pike 
 Mount Scatterbrain 
 Mount Sellheim 
 North Sampson Mountain 
 Racecourse Mountain 
 Shields Sugarloaf
 Tandewarrah 
 The Brothers 
 The Twins
 Three Peaks
 Zillman Peak

History 

Yalanji  (also known as Kuku Yalanji, Kuku Yalaja, Kuku Yelandji, and Gugu Yalanji) is an Australian Aboriginal language of Far North Queensland. The traditional lands of the Western Yalanji people commence just north of the township of Lakeland and continue southwards past the southern boundary of the locality of Lakeland.

James Earl was granted a lease to occupy pastoral land in March 1877. He named his station Butchers Hill after Butcher Hill Farm in Littleport, Cambridgeshire, England where he lived as a child.  It was also known as Turalba Station. The locality was variously known as being in the Cooktown or Laura districts. In September 1899 Earl's daughter Sarah Campbell Earl of Turalba Station married Samuel William Wellington Cook, a part owner of the adjacent Spring Vale Station. These two stations comprise the majority of the current locality of Lakeland.

Mining had commenced on the West Normanby Goldfield by the end of 1874. This goldfield should not be confused with the Normanby Goldfield near Bowen, which opened in 1871. Mining continued intermittently, depending on gold prices, until 1999.

The Normanby Diggings Native Mounted Police camp was located on the West Normanby River just south-east of Butchers Hill and operated for 7 years between 1885 and 1892.

The Normanby Reefs Post Office was renamed Earlton (Earltown) Post Office in 1890. It was closed in December 1892.

Clive J Foyster was an entrepreneur, mining company chief and farmer who bought Butchers Hill in 1968. In a private venture known as Lakeland Downs development began with the clearing of land intended for agriculture, and two irrigation dams were constructed. Dry land and irrigated cropping commenced with plantings of maize and sorghum and later of peanuts and coffee. More intensive cattle grazing also commenced. Eventually  were cleared.

Lakeland Downs is named for William (Billy) Lakeland who was one of the earliest prospectors of Cape York Peninsula. The township of Lakeland Downs came into being to service this development, and is now known as Lakeland.

Butcher's Hill State School opened on 23 August 1969. The first teacher was Lorraine Woergoetter. Within two years it had been renamed Lakeland Downs State School.

Heritage listings

Lakeland has a number of heritage-listed sites, including:
 Mareeba Mining District: Nuggety Gully Water Race and Chinese Camp

Economy

At Lakeland, most of the irrigation water comes from farm dams. Licenses are required to extract surface or bore water for irrigation purposes. In 2012 there were 16 licenses to impound water in the Normanby catchment, with most occurring in the Lakeland area. Many of the dams are located on small creeks. Honey Dam is the largest and is located on Bullhead Creek, which flows into the Laura River. Dams are only permitted to store wet season run off. 

The main products are cattle and cropping, including bananas.

Education 
Lakeland State School is a government primary (Early Childhood-6) school for boys and girls on the corner of Peninsula Developmental Road and the Mulligan Highway. In 2018, the school had an enrolment of 17 students with 2 teachers and 4 non-teaching staff (2 full-time equivalent).

There is no secondary school in Lakeland. The nearest government secondary school is Cooktown State School in Cooktown to the north-east. Given the distances involved, distance education and boarding school are other options.

Enviromental 
The Lakeland Agricultural Area Water Quality Monitoring Program is a project to work with landowners to monitor water quality.

In 2016 the Queensland Government purchased Springvale Station, a  property situated in the east of the locality. Springvale Station was purchased to add to the State’s protected area network and complement activities being taken to reduce sediment run-off entering the Normanby River catchment that flows into Princess Charlotte Bay and the Great Barrier Reef. The Department of Environment and Science contracted Cape York Natural Resource Management (Cape York NRM) to work with Traditional Owners, Griffith University, the Department of Agriculture and Fisheries, and erosion, water quality and vegetation scientists to develop the Springvale Erosion Management Plan.

Springvale Station Nature Refuge provides important habitat for endangered or vulnerable flora and fauna including the Cooktown orchid, ghost bat, northern quoll, red goshawk, spectacled flying-fox, spotted-tailed quoll, Semon’s leaf nosed bat and large eared-horseshoe bat. There is no public access on the Nature Refuge.

Amenities

Lakeland has a hotel, a cafe, and roadhouse and a hardware store.

Attractions 
James Earl Lookout is off the Mulligan Highway,  SSE of the town.

Transport 
Lakeland Airport (YLND) is located north of the township, beside the Mulligan Highway.

References

Further reading 
Trezise, P.J. 1969. Quinkan Country: Adventures in Search of Aboriginal Cave Paintings in Cape York. A.H. & A.W. Reed, Sydney.
Trezise, Percy. 1973. Last Days of a Wilderness. William Collins (Aust) Ltd., Brisbane. .
Trezise, P.J. 1993. Dream Road: A Journey of Discovery. Allen & Unwin, St. Leonards, Sydney.
Premier's Department (prepared by Connell Wagner). 1989. Cape York Peninsula Resource Analysis. Cairns. (1989). 
Roth, W.E. 1897. The Queensland Aborigines. 3 Vols. Reprint: Facsimile Edition, Hesperian Press, Victoria Park, W.A., 1984. 
Ryan, Michelle and Burwell, Colin, eds. 2000. Wildlife of Tropical North Queensland: Cooktown to Mackay. Queensland Museum, Brisbane.  (set of 3 vols).
Scarth-Johnson, Vera. 2000. National Treasures: Flowering plants of Cooktown and Northern Australia. Vera Scarth-Johnson Gallery Association, Cooktown.  (pbk);  Limited Edition - Leather Bound.
Sutton, Peter (ed). Languages of Cape York: Papers presented to a Symposium organised by the Australian Institute of Aboriginal Studies. Australian Institute of Aboriginal Studies, Canberra. (1976). 
Wynter, Jo and Hill, John. 1991. Cape York Peninsula: Pathways to Community Economic Development. The Final Report of The Community Economic Development Projects Cook Shire. Cook Shire Council.

External links 

 

 
Towns in Queensland
Populated places in Far North Queensland
Shire of Cook
Localities in Queensland